Vanessa Matz (born 1973) is a Belgian politician and a member of the cdH. She was elected as a member of the Belgian Senate in 2007 until 2014 and was then elected as a member of the Belgian Federal Parliament on 25 May 2014.

Notes

Living people
1973 births
Centre démocrate humaniste politicians
21st-century Belgian politicians
21st-century Belgian women politicians
Members of the Chamber of Representatives (Belgium)